Polymers is an international peer-reviewed open access scientific journal of polymer science that provides an interdisciplinary forum for publishing papers which advance the field of polymerization methods among others. It was established in 2009 and is published monthly by MDPI. The editor-in-chief is Alexander Böker (Fraunhofer-Institute for Applied Polymer Research).

Abstracting and indexing
The journal is abstracted and indexed in:

According to the Journal Citation Reports, the journal has a 2020 impact factor of 4.329.

Polymers Section 

 Polymer Chemistry Section
 Polymer Analysis Section
 Polymer Physics Section
 Polymer Theory and Simulation Section
 Polymer Processing and Performance Section
 Polymer Applications Section
 Biomacromolecules, Biobased and Biodegradable Polymers Section
 Polymer Recycling Section
 Polymer Composites and Nanocomposites Section
 Green and Sustainable Chemistry in Polymer Science Section

References

External links 
 

Chemistry journals
Open access journals
Publications established in 2009
MDPI academic journals
Monthly journals
English-language journals